Johnston Senior High School (JHS) is a public high school located in Johnston, Rhode Island, United States. It is part of the Johnston Public School System and has approximately 900 students in grades 9 through 12. The school colors are Columbia blue and white and the school mascot is the Panther. In 2005, JHS was named a Rhode Island Department of Education Regents' Commended School. The 2018–2019 school year principal is Dennis Morrell; assistant principals are Michael Mancieri and Donna Pennacchia.

Administration

Superintendent of schools: Dr. Bernard DiLullo
Principal: Dr. Donna Pennacchia
Assistant Principal: Susan Volante
Assistant Principal: Matthew Velino

Testing
The following exams are administered throughout the school year.

NECAP
New England Common Assessment Program (NECAP) is a Rhode Island State Assessment tests junior students (11) on four key subject areas, reading, writing and mathematics, with science tested in the spring. The program's primary goal is a standardized test based on uniform Grade-Level Expectations (GLEs).

RIAA
Rhode Island Alternate Assessment (RIAA) was a new 2008 Rhode Island State Assessment that tests students on four key subject areas. This testing is for sophomores (10) and juniors (11). They are tested on reading, writing, mathematics and science.

ACCESS for ELLs
ACCESS for ELLs is a Rhode Island State Assessment that tests students on English language proficiency. *This test is for sophomores, juniors and seniors (12).

PSAT/NMSQT
The Preliminary SAT/National Merit Scholarship Qualifying Test is given to sophomores and juniors. It is a practice session for the upcoming SATs. The PSAT/NMSQT is a multiple-choice standardized test administered by the College Board and National Merit Scholarship Corporation. An estimated 1.3 million juniors and sophomores take the test each year. Recently, some ninth, eighth and even seventh graders have also begun taking this test. The scores from the PSAT are used (with the permission of the student) to determine eligibility for the National Merit Scholarship Program.

SAT
The SAT Reasoning Test is a standardized test for college admissions in the United States. The SAT is administered by the not-for-profit College Board corporation in the United States and is developed, published and scored by the Educational Testing Service (ETS).

Music
The following classes are part of the curriculum for Music education.

Chorus: Students enrolled in Chorus learn how to sing scales, listen properly, read notes, and sing as a choir.

Instrumental band: The Johnston High School Band and Chorus perform at three set concerts every year, Winter Concert at the JHS Auditorium, Spring Concert at the JHS Auditorium. During the last out-of-state competition to Williamsburg, Virginia, the band and chorus competed against other New England States. The band scored second in their division and the chorus were scored first place in their division.

Music appreciation, music theory and music history
In music appreciation, music theory and music history, students learn about different genres of music, instrument groups, famous music works and historical composers.

Arts and activities
Johnston High School Students can participate in a number of extra-curricular school clubs, such as:
"SADD" - Students Against Dangerous Decisions
"Webclub" - Students help to maintain the JHS website
"Drama" - Students act in plays, dance and decorate sets
"Yearbook" - Students help to design the school yearbook
"World Cultures" - Students share cultural values through food fairs, cultural exhibits, etc.
"Newspaper" - Students write articles, draw cartoons, or edit the school newspaper, The Pawprint
"Parade Float Committee" - Students help to design their class float for homecoming
"All Sports" - All sports, such as those listed in the category below, are all extra-curricular activities
"Academic Decathlon"

There are many activities for the students to participate in, in school as well academic grades:
"Foreign Language" - Students can learn the languages of Italian, and Spanish.
"Art" - Students can make art, such as ceramics, paintings and drawings.
"Band" - Students learn how to play a musical instrument and read music.
"Chorus" - Students learn the art of singing, proper posture and how to read music.
"Health/PE" - This is a required class. Students must complete a ½ semester (.5 credit) per year.
"Portfolio Workshop" - Students organize, and build their graduation portfolios.
"Computer Applications" - Students learn how to operate a computer. This is a required technology credit.
"Music Appreciation" - Students learn about different instruments and genres of music.

Sports and awards
American football - 2008 Division III Super Bowl champions, 2008 Dick Reynolds Sportsmanship Award winners
Baseball - 2008 Division II North Regular Season champions
Softball
Hockey
Soccer
Basketball
Cheerleader/majorette squads
Volleyball
Cross country
Hockey - 2003 and 2004 Metropolitan Summer Hockey champions (28 straight wins, state record), 2003 MVP Jay Marsland, 2004 MVP Brett Waterman
Wrestling 2003 Division 1 Champions

Notable alumni
Jeanine Calkin, state senator
Pauly D, American television personality and DJ

References

Johnston Senior High School Mission Statement, Administration
Johnston Senior High School Students Testing

External links
Johnston High School home page
Johnston Public Schools
Rhode Island Department of Education

Buildings and structures in Johnston, Rhode Island
Schools in Providence County, Rhode Island
Public high schools in Rhode Island
1968 establishments in Rhode Island